Our Time is the ninth single of Japanese pop group Dream. The single reached #25 on the weekly Oricon charts and charted for three weeks.  The title track was used as an opening theme for the TV Tokyo show Sukiyaki!! London Boots Daisakusen. The music video of the song was shot on the location of Oahu Island in Hawaii.

Track list
 Our Time (original mix)
 Our Time (instrumental)
 My will (live version)
 solve (Hex Hector remix)

Credits
 Mai Matsumuro (lyrics)
 D.A.I (music)
 Izumi "D・M・X" Miyazaki (arrangement)

External links
 http://www.oricon.co.jp/music/release/d/453039/1/

2001 singles
Dream (Japanese group) songs
Songs written by Mai Matsumuro
2001 songs
Avex Trax singles